Trapeze: The Unexpurgated Diary of Anaïs Nin, 1947–1955 is a volume of diary entries by Anaïs Nin from her life between 1947 and 1955, first published in 2017 by Swallow Press. It was edited by Paul Herron, and features an introduction by Benjamin Franklin V.

References

2017 non-fiction books
Books published posthumously
Diaries of Anaïs Nin
Swallow Press books